Sibu is an impact crater that lies within the Margaritifer Sinus quadrangle (MC-19) region on the surface of the planet Mars, in the Valles Marineris hemisphere in an area southeast of the crater Jones.

It was named after the town of Sibu in Sarawak, Malaysia in 1976.

References 
 

Impact craters on Mars
Margaritifer Sinus quadrangle